

This is a list of the  National Register of Historic Places listings in Dickenson County, Virginia.

This is intended to be a detailed table of the property on the National Register of Historic Places in Dickenson County, Virginia, United States.  The locations of National Register properties and districts for which the latitude and longitude coordinates are included below may be seen in a Google map.

There is 1 property listed on the National Register in the county.

Current listings

|}

See also
 List of National Historic Landmarks in Virginia
 National Register of Historic Places listings in Virginia

References

 
Dickenson